{{Speciesbox
| status = LC
| status_system = IUCN3.1
| status_ref = <ref name="iucn status 11 November 2021">{{cite iucn |authors= Scott, N., Cacciali, P., Kacoliris, F., Pelegrin, N. & Carreira, S. |date=2019 |title='Tropidurus catalanensis |volume=2019|page= e.T49845528A49845530|url=https://www.iucnredlist.org/species/49845528/49845530 |access-date=16 December 2021}}</ref>
| image = Tropidurus catalanensis-basking.jpg
| taxon = Tropidurus catalanensis
| authority = Gudynas & Skuk, 1983
}}Tropidurus catalanensis'' is a species of lizard in the family Tropiduridae, the neotropical ground lizards.

Geographic range
It is native to South America, where it can be found in Argentina, Paraguay, Uruguay, and Brazil.

Classification
It is important to note that these lizards are not the same as the common side-blotched lizard.

References

External links

Tropidurus
Lizards of South America
Reptiles of Argentina
Reptiles of Paraguay
Reptiles of Uruguay
Reptiles of Brazil
Reptiles described in 1983